Tálín is a municipality and village in Písek District in the South Bohemian Region of the Czech Republic. It has about 200 inhabitants.

Administrative parts
The village of Kukle is an administrative part of Tálín.

References

Villages in Písek District